Cave del Valle (The Valley's Cave), locally also known as La Viejarrona (Old Girl),  is located near El Cerro Village in the municipality of Rasines in Cantabria, northern Spain. The cave is the source of the Silencio River, a tributary of the Rio Ruahermosa, which in turn is a tributary of the Asón River. Notable for its prehistoric, but particularly for its speleologic significance as it is recognized as one of the longest cavities in the world. The site is very popular among cavers, who have explored a total of over  so far.

Prehistoric occupation

Although situated in the renown Franco-Cantabrian region, the discovery of prehistoric rock paintings has never been reported. In 1905 a priest named Lorenzo Sierra discovered the first objects, tools and artifacts that account for human occupation as early as 9,000 years ago. Documented are Azilian harpoons and scrapers, Upper Magdalenian spear points and other bone tools. Stone tools include chisels and various types of scrapers. Latest excavations were made from 1996 to 1998. A perforated and decorated stick of archaeological interest was found at this site, but is now lost. However, the National Archaeological Museum retains a copy and there exists another pierced pole, preserved in the Regional Museum of Prehistory and Archaeology of Cantabria, although of less importance than the lost specimen as it is not decorated.

Caving site

The cave of the valley is recognized as one of the longest explored caves in the world with more than  yet explored. The site is, apart from professional speleologists, also well known among sport - and hobby practitioners of caving.

See also
Caves in Cantabria

References

External links
 Margarita Díaz-Andreu (13 November 2012). Archaeological Encounters: Building Networks of Spanish and British Archaeologists in the 20th Century. Cambridge Scholars Publishing. pp. 206–. .

Prehistoric sites in Spain
Archaeological sites in Spain
Valle
Art of the Upper Paleolithic
Azilian